Wannabe Widowed is a 2013 black comedy film directed by Massimo Venier.

It is a remake of 1959 Dino Risi's film Il vedovo.

Cast
Luciana Littizzetto as Susanna Almiraghi
Fabio De Luigi as Alberto Nardi
Alessandro Besentini as Stucchi
Francesco Brandi as Giancarlo
Roberto Citran as Augusto Fenoglio
Bebo Storti as Pier
Ninni Bruschetta as Marcello Perlasca
Luciano Scarpa as Roberto
Clizia Fornasier as Giada
Fulvio Falzarano as Giada's father
Alessandra Raichi as Giada's mother
Andrea Bruschi as the businessman
Stefano Chiodaroli as Arturo

References

External links
 

2013 comedy films
Films directed by Massimo Venier
2013 black comedy films
2013 films
Italian black comedy films
Remakes of Italian films
2010s Italian-language films
2010s Italian films